William Alaric Smith (June 11, 1925 - November 14, 2006) was a professional baseball umpire who worked in the American League from 1960 to 1964. Smith umpired 798 major league games in his 5-year career. He umpired in the 1964 World Series, and two All-Star Games (1961 and 1963).

References

1925 births
2006 deaths
Major League Baseball umpires
[[Categ
ory:Sportspeople from Louisiana]]

Al Smith's two blow calls at first base in Game 5 of the 1964 World Series cost the Yankees Game 5 and the World Series. He retired after the World Series